Gonzalo Joaquín Najar (born 27 November 1993) is an Argentine cyclist, who is currently suspended from the sport after a positive doping test.

Career
Najar was the 2017 Argentina national champion.

2018 Vuelta a San Juan
Najar won the 5th stage of the 2018 Vuelta a San Juan.  Heading into the 5th stage, he was in 14th place, but after the stage he had over a minute lead. However, he was later stripped of his win; in May 2018, Najar tested positive for the third-generation EPO-based blood booster CERA on January 21 - the day of the opening stage of the 2018 Vuelta a San Juan. He was given a four-year ban.

Major results
2017
 National Road Championships
1st  Road race
4th Time trial
2018
 1st  Overall Vuelta a San Juan
1st Stage 5

References

External links

1993 births
Living people
Argentine male cyclists
Doping cases in cycling